Stalag Luft 7 was a World War II Luftwaffe prisoner-of-war camp located in Bankau, Silesia, Germany (now Bąków, Opole Voivodeship, Poland).

Camp history
The camp was opened on 6 June 1944, for RAF NCO flying crews and by July held 230 prisoners. They were joined by members of the Glider Pilot Regiment captured at the Battle of Arnhem in September 1944. By 1 January 1945, the camp held 1,578 prisoners. This was made up of 1,075 British, 252 Canadian, 134 Australian, 26 New Zealand, 24 French, 15 Polish, 14 South African, 11 Irish and 10 US. Others were Rhodesian, Maltese, Dutch, Belgian and Czech.

On 19 January 1945, 1,500 prisoners marched out of camp in bitter cold. They crossed a bridge over the river Oder on 21 January, reached Goldberg on 5 February, and were loaded onto a train.

See also
 List of prisoner-of-war camps in Germany

References

External links
B24.net
The Last Escape - John Nichol, Tony Rennell - 2002 Penguin UK

 

World War II prisoner of war camps in Germany
World War II sites in Poland